Charles West (1816–1898) was a British physician, specialized in pediatrics and obstetrics, especially known as the founder of the first children's hospital in Great Britain, the Hospital for Sick Children in Great Ormond Street, London.

Life

Early life and education

Charles West was born in London on 8 August 1816. His father was a Baptist lay preacher who in 1821 became a minister of a Baptist congregation in Buckinghamshire where he also ran a school for young boys. Charles received his first education in his father's school. When he was fifteen, Charles West became an apprentice to a Mr. Gray, a general practitioner of Amersham who had also been an apothecary in a hospital. West

In 1833, he entered as a medical student at St. Bartholomew's Hospital where he remained two years with good results and some awards. When, in 1835, the theological opinions of his father prevented him to transfer to Oxford University he decided to complete his medical education in Continental Europe. So, he went to study in Bonn, then in Paris and finally in Berlin where he earned his Medical Degree in September 1837. Then, between 1838 and 1839, he spent almost a year in Dublin working at the Rotunda Hospital and at the Meath Hospital, highly renowned at the time for the clinical glamour of Robert Graves and William Stokes.

Professional career

Back in London, West, after some years as a Clinical Clerk at St. Bartholomew's, in 1842 was appointed physician to the Universal Dispensary for Children in Waterloo Road, then lecturer in midwifery at the Middlesex Hospital in 1845 and later (1848–61) again lecturer in midwifery also at St. Bartholomew's Hospital. He became more and more involved in the medical problems of children and the first edition of his Lectures on the diseases of infancy and childhood (Longman 1848) was a great success and gave him sudden fame.

The Hospital for Sick Children

After some unfortunate attempts to transform the Waterloo Dispensary for children into a hospital, he decided to start a fundraising campaign in order to establish in London a hospital specifically for children. Also due to his remarkable oratorical gifts, West's campaign had success and, in the spring of 1851, a little hospital with ten beds was opened at 49 Great Ormond Street, in a house that had belonged to Richard Mead. In 1854, after three years of activity, Charles West - who was the first physician of the hospital - could describe the initial success of the structure. He also took advantage from this success to boost research funds in view of further enlargement:

.
Thanks to his tireless activity, the hospital continued to grow in size and prestige, becoming until today one of the world's leading pediatric facilities.

Conversion to Catholicism and later life

In 1877, following a disagreement with the hospital's management committee, West's collaboration with Great Ormond Street Hospital came to an end. West believed that the heart of the disagreement was his conversion to Catholicism which led the committee to think that he ‘could not be trusted for the future’. It must be added, however, that West, along with many qualities, had always had a difficult character, as he had already expressed, for example, in his years of collaboration with the St Bartholomew's Hospital. His self-defense, along with his Christian vision of a pediatrician's mission, was fully mentioned in the obituary published after his death in the British Medical Journal:

.
From 1880, he became more and more uncomfortable with London's climate and decided to practice in Nice during the winters. In 1891 a bad attack of neuralgia began to affect his health, even if he continued to devote himself to the profession and to sick children until shortly before his death, occurred in Paris on 19 March 1898. His last days were remembered by a friend of him, Dr. R. L. Bowles:

.

Charles West married twice. From his first marriage he had a son and a daughter. He was buried in the cemetery of Chislehurst in the London Borough of Bromley.

Appointments and honours

Charles West became a Member of the Royal College of Physicians in 1842, and a Fellow in 1848. In 1863 he became Censor, and in 1870 Senior Censor of the college. About the same time he was elected a Corresponding Member of the Paris Académie de Médecine. He was President of the Royal Medical and Chirurgical Society in the years 1877–78, and Examiner to the Universities of London and Cambridge, and to the College of Physicians.

Some writings

 Lectures on the diseases of infancy and childhood, Longman, Brown, Green, & Longmans, London 1848, pp. XXIII-488 [subsequent Longmans' enlarged and revised editions in 1852, 1854, 1859, 1865, 1874 and 1884]
 The profession of medicine: its study, and practice its duties, and rewards: An address delivered at Saint Bartholomew's Hospital on the opening of the medical session of 1850-51, Longman, Brown, Green, and Longmans, London 1850, pp. 32 [new edition: Kegan Paul, Trench, Trübner, London 1896]
 How to nurse sick children; Intended especially as a help to the nurses at the Hospital for Sick Children, Longman & C., London 1854, pp. 79 [II ed., London 1860, pp. 95: Author's name was indicated only on this second edition]
 Lectures on the diseases of women, John Churchill, London 1856–1858, 2 volumes [subsequent Churchill's enlarged and revised editions in 1858, 1864 and 1879] 
 On some disorders of the nervous system in childhood: being the Lumleian Lectures delivered at the Royal College of Physicians of London in March 1871, Longmans, Green, London 1871, pp. 136
 Harvey and his times. The Harveian Oration for 1874, Longmans, Green, London 1874, pp. 64 
 On hospital organisation: with special reference to the organisation of hospitals for children, Macmillan, London 1877, pp. IX-97
 Address of Charles West, M.D., F.R.C.P., President of the Royal Medical and Chirurgical Society of London, at the Annual Meeting, March 1, 1879, Adlard, London 1879, pp. 24
 A letter to Lord Aberdare, chairman of the Managing Committee of the Hospital for Sick Children, Sotheran & Co., London 1887, pp. 32

Bibliography
 Anonymous, Obituary: Charles West, M.D., F.R.C.P., Founder of and some time Physician to the Hospital for Sick Children, Great Ormond Street, London, British Medical Journal, 2 April 1898, vol. 1(1944), pp. 921-923
  F.S. Besser, "Notes on Dr. Charles West and his grave in Chislehurst (Kent)", Hist Med, 1975, vol. 6(3-4), pp. 47–50
 Luca Borghi, When human touch makes the difference. The legacy of Charles West (1816-1898), pediatrics pioneer, Medicina Historica, 2017, 1(1):13-8
 Luca Borghi, Anna Marchetti, Introducing the trained and educated gentlewoman into the wards of a children’s hospital. The role of Charles West, M.D. (1816-1898) in the rise of pediatric nursing, Medicina Historica, 2018, 2(2):63-74
 Peter M Dunn, Dr Charles West (1816-98) of London and the cold syndrome, Archives of Disease in Childhood, 1991; 66: 455-456
 Kevin Telfer, The remarkable story of Great Ormond Street Hospital, Simon & Schuster, London 2007, pp. 208
 John Walker-Smith, "Charles West", in W.F.Bynum and H.Bynum (eds.), Dictionary of Medical Biography, Greenwood Press, Westport-London 2007, vol. 5, pp. 1297–8

Notes

1816 births
1898 deaths
British paediatricians
English obstetricians
English Roman Catholics
19th-century English medical doctors
Converts to Roman Catholicism from Baptist denominations
Physicians of Great Ormond Street Hospital